This was the first edition of the tournament since 1987.

Anna Bondár won the title, defeating Diane Parry in the final, 6–3, 6–3.

Seeds

Draw

Finals

Top half

Bottom half

Qualifying

Seeds

Qualifiers

Qualifying draw

First qualifier

Second qualifier

Third qualifier

Fourth qualifier

References

External Links
Main Draw
Qualifying Draw

Argentina Open - Singles
WTA Argentine Open